Lu Yuansheng also Lu Yuan-sheng, (born 7 October 1954) is a male Chinese former international table tennis player and current coach.

He won a gold medal at the 1975 World Table Tennis Championships in the men's team event and a silver medal in the men's doubles at the 1977 World Table Tennis Championships with Huang Liang.

He was the Chinese coach for both the men's team (1992) and women's team (1996), (2000) and (2004) in four consecutive Olympic Games.

See also
 List of table tennis players
 List of World Table Tennis Championships medalists

References

Chinese male table tennis players
Living people
1954 births
Sportspeople from Ningbo
Table tennis players from Zhejiang
Table tennis players from Shanghai
World Table Tennis Championships medalists
20th-century Chinese people